Lerona is an unincorporated community in Fresno County, California.

Lerona was a flag stop and station on the San Joaquin & Eastern railroad line. The origin of the name is unknown.

The Lerona School District was founded in 1923.

References

Unincorporated communities in California
Unincorporated communities in Fresno County, California